Mohamed Hasan Cegu Isadean (born 12 May 1944) is a Sri Lankan politician, a former member of the Parliament of Sri Lanka and a former government minister. He is the founder and chairman of Sri Lanka Muslim Congress and immensely contributed to the development of the party during that time, and is also believed as the person who has written the party's constitution. 

He served as the opposition leader of merged North-Eastern provincial council as well and held many deputy ministerial and ministerial portfolios such as Export Development, Mass Media Information, Rural Economic Development and Highways.

References

1944 births
Living people
Government ministers of Sri Lanka
Members of the 12th Parliament of Sri Lanka
Members of the 13th Parliament of Sri Lanka
Sri Lankan Malays
Sri Lankan Muslims
United People's Freedom Alliance politicians